The following are lists of Bulgarian football transfers that happened in the winter between 2011 and 2012. They are listed by team.

Beroe

In:

Out:

Botev Vratsa

In:

Out:

Cherno More

In:

Out:

Chernomorets Burgas

In:

 

Out:

CSKA Sofia

In:

Out:

Kaliakra Kavarna

In:

Out:

Levski Sofia

In:

Out:

Litex Lovech

In:

Out:

Lokomotiv Plovdiv

In:

Out:

Lokomotiv Sofia

In:

Out:

Ludogorets Razgrad

In:

Out:

Minyor Pernik

In:

Out:

Montana

In:

Out:

Slavia Sofia

In:

Out:

Svetkavitsa

In:

Out:

Vidima-Rakovski

In:

Out:

References

Bulgaria
Winter 2011-12